Radio Caraïbes is a radio station founded in 1949 by the Brown family that broadcasts live from Port-au-Prince, Haiti.  it was run by Wilson Monk. Caraïbes FM hosts the most popular talk show on the island called Ranmase, rebroadcast from a handful of radio station from Miami to Montreal and Paris. Former journalists include Jean-Jahkob Jeudy, Directeur de programmation et affaires publiques de Radio Cacique d'Haïti; Louinel Saintalbord; Carlo Sainristil; and Jean-Samuel Trezil.

Phanord Cabé is the Social Media Manager.

See also
 Media of Haiti

References

External links
 Listen Online on All Live Radio
 Listen Online on Televizyon Lakay 
 Listen Online on ZenoLive
 Listen Online on TuneIn
 Listen Online on Online Radio Box
 Listen Online on Haiti Broadcasting 
 Listen Online on Haiti Media Live 
 Listen Online on Radio Online Live 
 Listen Online on Live Online Radio 

Radio stations in Haiti
Radio stations established in 1949
1949 establishments in Haiti